Oxlade is a surname. Notable people with the surname include:

 Alex Oxlade-Chamberlain (born 1993), English professional footballer
 Allen Martindale Oxlade (1882-1932), Australian rugby player
 Aubrey Oxlade (1882–1955), Australian cricket administrator
 Boyd Oxlade (1943–2014), Australian author and screenwriter
 Chris Oxlade (born 1961), British author and illustrator
 Gail Vaz-Oxlade (born 1959), Jamaican-Canadian financial writer and television personality
 Jocelyn Oxlade (born 1984), Filipino-British singer and model
 Roy Oxlade (1929–2014), English painter and writer on art